Abu Sujak bin Mahmud (4 January 1939 – 11 February 2021) was a Malaysian politician who served as Mayor of Shah Alam and Deputy Menteri Besar of Selangor.

Death
On 11 February 2021, Abu Sujak died from old age. He was 82 years old.

Election results

Honours

Honours of Malaysia
  :
 Officer of the Order of the Defender of the Realm (KMN) (1990)
  :
  Recipient of the Meritorious Service Medal (PJK)
  Recipient of the Distinguished Conduct Medal (PPT)
  Companion of the Order of Sultan Salahuddin Abdul Aziz Shah (SSA)
  Knight Companion of the Order of Sultan Salahuddin Abdul Aziz Shah (DSSA) – Dato' (1988)

References

1939 births
2021 deaths
People from Selangor
Malaysian people of Malay descent
Malaysian Muslims
United Malays National Organisation politicians
Members of the Selangor State Legislative Assembly
Officers of the Order of the Defender of the Realm